The men's featherweight event was part of the boxing programme at the 1952 Summer Olympics.  The weight class allowed boxers of up to 57 kilograms to compete. The competition was held from 28 July to 2 August 1952. 30 boxers from 30 nations competed.

Medalists

Results

References

Featherweight